Klejdi Lupa (Greek: Κλέιντι Λούπα; born 7 June 1985), known professionally as Claydee, is a Greek-Albanian singer, songwriter and producer. He has produced works that fall into the dance-pop, RnB and house music categories. His songs have charted as Top 10 hits in countries such as Greece, Spain, Albania, Russia, Poland, Cyprus and Serbia. His songs have also surpassed 582 million streams and YouTube views combined.

Life and career 

Lupa was born in Albania and moved to Athens, Greece, with his family at the age of four. Graduating from high school, he pursued a degree in Audio Engineering at SAE (International Technology College) that he completed in 2006. A year later, he obtained a BA in Recording Arts from Middlesex University. After concluding his degrees, in 2008, he went on to work at MTV Greece.

Lupa released his first personal track "Call Me" which was awarded the Best Dance Video Clip at the MADTv Awards in 2011. His second track, "Deep Inside", was a pop-dance track. In the summer of 2012 he released the international hit "Mamacita Buena" which became the first song produced in Greece to have the most views on YouTube and reached No.1 at the airplay chart in Greece while simultaneously being released internationally by Ultra Music. The song was also featured in the NBC TV series Telenovela, which stars Eva Longoria. He was nominated for Best Greek Act Award at the MTV Europe Music Awards.

His single "Sexy Papi" reached the No.1 in the airplay charts in countries such as Greece, Poland and Serbia while Coca-Cola in Greece chose him to go on tour with the brand for the summer of 2013. He performed in a number of countries, including Cyprus, Albania, Serbia, Poland, Romania, Russia, Canada, United States, Sweden and Italy and at Athens Arena.

In 2010, Claydee co-created "Down2Earth Music", a music industry consulting and artist development company, with his friend Evan Klimakis. It launched Down2Earth Records, a mainstream dance label.

In 2015, Lupa released the song "Utopia" with his side project Bang La Decks. The song was featured in the video game FIFA 15 and the TV series Power and Teen Wolf. An adaptation of the song titled "How Bad Do You Want It" with vocals by Shevyn Streeter was also included in the soundtrack for the film Furious 7.

In 2018, Lupa released the song "Later Bitches" with his musical side project The Prince Karma. It reached #12 on the Worldwide Shazam Chart and amassed more than 150 million Spotify streams. The song was later used for the beer company Desperados' "We Are the Party" advertising campaign in 2020. It was eventually certified Platinum in France and Gold in Germany.

Claydee collaborated with Greek singer Eleni Foureira on the song "Loquita" in 2019. The song won the "Best Duet" award at the MAD Video Music Awards in 2020.

Claydee released the single "Detente" in 2021. The song became viral on TikTok, amassing more than 9 million views.

Producer and songwriter 

Experience he gained while working for MTV Greece led to work as a producer and a songwriter, under his alias Beetkraft, beginning with the song "The End" by Reckless, which was released by Sony Music Greece and reached a top-rank position in the UK Club Charts. He went on to write and produce, under his real name, "Last Summer" sung by Nikos Ganos, the Track of the Year at the 2011 MAD TV Awards. The track was released by Heaven Music in Greece and in 35 countries internationally.

In 2011, he co-wrote "Tonight" with Playmen, sung by Tamta, which reached No.1 in the airplay charts in Greece. Songs under his alias Beetkraft include "Agries diatheseis" by Kostas Martakis, "Niose tin Kardia" by Tamta (in which he raps as well) and "To allo sou miso" for Sakis Rouvas, featured in his double platinum album Parafora.

Personal life 

Some years after his establishment in Greece, Lupa legally took the name Nikodimos. He is also a professional Latin dancer. He has a son, born in 2016.

Awards

Discography

Producer and Songwriter

Claydee Singles

As The Prince Karma

Work with Bang La Decks

References 

1985 births
21st-century Albanian male singers
21st-century Greek male singers
Albanian emigrants to Greece
Albanian songwriters
Albanian record producers
Greek house musicians
Greek people of Albanian descent
Greek record producers
Greek songwriters
Living people
Musicians from Athens
Musicians from Tirana
Albanian pop musicians